Muara Angke is a fishing port located at Kapuk Muara, Penjaringan, along the north coast of Jakarta, Indonesia. The port is integrated with fishermen's housing and a fishing port management office owned by the Jakarta government. It has modern fish market with supporting facilities for landing and auction of fishes. The port is located at the mouth of Angke River, where it meets Java Sea. Muara Angke Wildlife Reserve is also located in this area, adjacent to Muara Karang.

Port
During the 16th century, the port was used by the Sultanate of Banten and the Sultanate of Demak as a strategic post to capture the port of Sunda Kelapa from the Portuguese. At present other than fishing vessels and landing facility, the port also has passenger service terminal for ship plying routes between the Thousand Islands and the mainland since 2012.

Fishing village
The area is inhabited by peoples who are associated with fishing. This is a community of fishermen who sail, dry fish, smoke squid, clean shellfish etc. The community is spread over 65 hectares. There is also a center for Traditional Fisheries Products Processing (PHPT), where various types of salted fish, pindang and smoked products are produced.

In addition to fish processing and drying places, there are also several shops that sell salted fish in large and retail quantities. Some of the salted fish is sent to other islands or exported. Fresh fish traders stand along the sidewalk can be seen in the area. The area is prone to flooding.

The fishermen and workers of the fishing industry living there are reluctant to leave the kampung no matter how disorganized and chaotic the environment in the fishing village. The Jakarta administration is building Muara Angke Social Housing project which will have 35 blocks of apartments to accommodate the peoples living in the area  Muara Angke Social Housing project.

Fish market
 
The fish market of Muara Angke started fish auction in 1846, and its history is associated with Jakarta. As one of the biggest fish auction and sale places in Indonesia, this fish market is often compared with Tsukiji Market in Japan.

The fish market is revitalized and inaugurated with modern facilities as Pasar Ikan Modern (PIM) in 2018. Spreading over 4.15 hectares land, the new fish market is a three-story building, equipped with supporting facilities, such as chilling rooms, ice storage, fish packing, banking services, health clinics, culinary tours, laboratories, mosques, parking area, electric substations and wastewater management installations. The market is planned to contain 900 wet stalls, 69 dry market stalls, 18 fishing stalls, and 68 fresh fish stalls. There are two floors prepared to accommodate traders. The ground floor is for wet fish stalls while the second floor is for stalls selling dried and processed fish. The market is designed to be the first fish market in Indonesia that is built in the concept of hygiene and one stop shopping for various fishery products.

See also 
 Jakarta Old Town

References

Fish markets
Tourist attractions in Jakarta
North Jakarta